Chain Reaction (nicknamed "the tag-team talk show") is a hostless chat show first broadcast on BBC Radio 5 in 1991, and then revived on BBC Radio 4 in 2004. Each week an individual from the world of entertainment selects someone that they would like to interview. This interviewee goes on to be the next week's interviewer.

Episodes

References

External links
 Official Radio 4 Chain Reaction page
 Transcript of Stewart Lee / Alan Moore
 Transcript of Alan Moore / Brian Eno

BBC Radio 4 programmes